Sumer is a town in the Sagar district of Madhya Pradesh.

Cities and towns in Sagar district
Sagar, Madhya Pradesh